Xiyuan Subdistrict,   is a township-level division of Jinjiang City, Quanzhou, Fujian Province, China.

See also
List of township-level divisions of Fujian

References

Township-level divisions of Fujian
Subdistricts of the People's Republic of China